Kennethmont railway station served the village of Kennethmont, Aberdeenshire, Scotland from 1854 to 1968 on the Great North of Scotland Railway.

History 
The station opened on 20 September 1854 by the Great North of Scotland Railway.  The station closed to both passengers and goods traffic on 6 May 1968.

References

External links 

Disused railway stations in Aberdeenshire
Former Great North of Scotland Railway stations
Railway stations in Great Britain opened in 1854
Railway stations in Great Britain closed in 1968
1854 establishments in Scotland
1968 disestablishments in Scotland
Beeching closures in Scotland